The 2018 MBC Drama Awards, presented by Munhwa Broadcasting Corporation(MBC) took place on December 30, 2018. It was hosted by Kim Yong-man and Seohyun.

Winners and nominees
Source:

Selfish Motive Awards
 Best Couple Award: Jang Ki-yong and Jin Ki-joo - Come and Hug Me
 Vocal King Award: Jang Hyuk - Bad Papa
 Organic Parody Award: Kim Kang-woo and Uee - My Contracted Husband, Mr. Oh
 Frustrator Award: Woo Do-hwan and Park Soo-young - Tempted
 Fighting Performer Award: Seohyun - Time
 In Awe Award: Shin Ha-kyun - Less Than Evil
 Bromance Award: Son Ho-jun, So Ji-sub, and Kang Ki-young - My Secret Terrius

Presenters

Special performances

See also
2018 KBS Drama Awards
2018 SBS Drama Awards

References

External links
  
 http://kshow123.net/show/2018-mbc-drama-awards/
 https://www.viki.com/tv/36433c-2018-mbc-drama-awards?locale=en
 https://www.soompi.com/article/1285603wpp/winners-2018-mbc-drama-awards

2018 in South Korean television
2018 television awards
MBC Drama Awards